This is a list of Chinese football transfers for the 2021 season winter transfer window.

Super League

Beijing Guoan

In:

Out:

Cangzhou Mighty Lions

In:

Out:

Changchun Yatai

In:

Out:

Chongqing Liangjiang Athletic

In:

Out:

Dalian Pro

In:

Out:

Guangzhou

In:

Out:

Guangzhou City

In:

Out:

Hebei

In:

Out:

Henan Songshan Longmen

In:

Out:

Qingdao

In:

Out:

Shandong Taishan

In:

Out:

Shanghai Port

In:

Out:

Shanghai Shenhua

In:

Out:

Shenzhen

In:

Out:

Tianjin Jinmen Tiger

In:

Out:

Wuhan

In:

Out:

League One

Beijing BIT

In:

Out:

Beijing BSU

In:

Out:

Chengdu Rongcheng

In:

Out:

Guizhou

In:

Out:

Heilongjiang Ice City

In:

Out:

Jiangxi Beidamen

In:

Out:

Kunshan

In:

Out:

Liaoning Shenyang Urban

In:

Out:

Meizhou Hakka

In:

Out:

Nanjing City

In:

Out:

Nantong Zhiyun

In:

Out:

Shaanxi Chang'an Athletic

In:

Out:

Sichuan Jiuniu

In:

Out:

Suzhou Dongwu

In:

Out:

Wuhan Three Towns

In:

Out:

Xinjiang Tianshan Leopard

In:

Out:

Zhejiang

In:

Out:

Zibo Cuju

In:

Out:

League Two

Dissolved

Notes

References

2021
China